Nykøbing Mors is the largest town on the island of Mors in the Limfjord in Denmark. The town received its charter in 1299 and has a population of 9,033 (1 January 2022). It is located in Morsø Municipality and belongs to Region Nordjylland.

History 

The town received its charter in 1299. Nykøbing was the seat of the former Dueholm monastery, now part of the Morsland Historical Museum.

Nykøbing was the place of birth of  Danish-Norwegian author Aksel Sandemose and the reputed inspiration for the fictional town of Jante, associated with the Jante Law, in Sandemose's novel A Fugitive Crosses His Tracks.

Søren Larsen and Sons owned a shipyard in Nykøbing Mors. There, the tall ship Søren Larsen was built in 1949. It is a brigantine. She is docked in Sydney, Australia.

Geography 
Nykøbing is located on the east coast of the island of Mors by the Sallingsund, a sound that separates Mors from the Salling peninsula on the mainland Jutland peninsula in Denmark. It is the largest town on Mors and the island's cultural center. Approximately half of the island's residents live in the area around Nykøbing.

Sport 
Located just outside the town on a spit is Nykøbing Mors Cricket Club Ground. 
The ground has in the past held Women's One Day Internationals, including matches for the now defunct Denmark women's team.

Notable people 

 Mads Christian Holm (1827 in Nykøbing Mors - 1892) a Danish shipbuilder and ship-owner who founded the shipping company D/S Norden
 Jens Lind (1874 in Nykøbing Mors – 1939) a Danish apothecary, botanist and mycologist
 Kirstine Smith (1878 in Nykøbing Mors – 1939)  statistician and creator of optimal design of experiments
 Aksel Sandemose (1899 in Nykøbing Mors – 1965) a Danish-Norwegian writer
 Tyge Ahrengot Christensen (1918 in Nykøbing Mors – 1996) a Danish botanist and phycologist
 John Degnbol-Martinussen (1947 in Nykobing Mors – 2002) Professor of international development at Roskilde University, and an authority on international development policy
 Karsten Hønge (born 1958 in Nykøbing Mors) a Danish politician
 Mogens Jensen (born 1963 in Nykøbing Mors) a Danish politician and current Minister for Food, Fisheries and Gender Equality and Nordic Cooperation
 Mayianne Dinesen (born 1966 in Nykøbing Mors) a Danish radio personality

Sport 
 Aksel Madsen (1899 in Nykøbing Mors – 1988) a long-distance runner, competed in the marathon at the 1928 Summer Olympics
 Tommy Troelsen (born 1940 in Nykøbing Mors - 2021) a former footballer, manager and TV presenter, 191 caps for Vejle Boldklub 
 Morten Hedegaard (born 1972 in Nykøbing Mors) a former Danish cricketer
 Mogens Dahl Nielsen (born 1972 in Nykøbing Mors) a former Danish cricketer
 Thomas Dalgaard (born 1984 in Nykøbing Mors) a Danish footballer with over 320 club caps

References

External links
 Morslands Historiske Museum 

This article is a translation of the corresponding article on the Danish Wikipedia, accessed on 25 April 2007.

Municipal seats of the North Jutland Region
Municipal seats of Denmark
Cities and towns in the North Jutland Region
Morsø Municipality